Cottus kolymensis is a species of freshwater ray-finned fish belonging to  the family Cottidae, the typical sculpins. It is endemic to Russia. It inhabits the Kolyma, Magadan, and Dukcha rivers. It reaches a maximum length of 9.9 cm.

References

Fish of Russia
Cottus (fish)
Fish described in 2012